Trieste (L9890) is a landing helicopter dock (LHD) of the Italian Navy with aircraft carrier capabilities. It had been expected to be commissioned in June 2022. However, as of mid-2022 that date was pushed back by several months into June 2023.

The ship will be equipped with medium helicopters like EH101 and NH90 and Lockheed Martin F-35B Lightning II aircraft. It will have a floodable well deck below the hangar level able to accommodate amphibious landing vessels such as LCM (new Cantieri Navali Vittoria LCM23 type), LCAC, and newer L-CAT (Landing Catamaran) vessels. It also can carry Ariete MBT, B1 Centauro tank destroyers, and up to 600 soldiers. Its base will be in Taranto.

The unit is being built at Fincantieri's Castellamare di Stabia facility near Naples, Italy. The first steel was cut on 12 January 2017 and construction of the hull was completed on 25 May 2019.The ship began sea trials in August 2021. It is the largest Italian military ship built after the Second World War. When commissioned it will be the largest vessel of the Italian Navy.

See also
 Italian Naval Aviation
 FREMM
 PPA, Pattugliatori Polivalenti d'Altura

References

Aircraft carriers of the Italian Navy
Ships built by Fincantieri
Ships built in La Spezia
2019 ships